Julio César Yegros Torres (born 31 January 1971) is a former Paraguayan footballer that played as a striker. His older brother Cirilo Yegros (born 1969) also played professional football (soccer).

Club career
At club level, Yegros played for teams like Cerro Porteño, Olimpia Asunción and Sportivo Luqueño of Paraguay; Cruz Azul, Tecos UAG and Pumas UNAM, Chiapas and Club León of Mexico; Mandiyú of Argentina and Deportes Tolima of Colombia.

Yegros spent most of his career playing in Mexico. He signed with Pumas, but after begin loaned to Club León, he was transferred to Querétaro F.C. in June 2003.

International career
Yegros made his international debut for the Paraguay national football team on 14 June 1991 in a friendly match against Bolivia (1-0 win). He obtained a total number of 15 international caps, scoring no goals for the national side. He represented Paraguay at the 1998 FIFA World Cup.

References

External links

1971 births
Living people
Paraguayan footballers
Cerro Porteño players
Club Olimpia footballers
Sportivo Luqueño players
Deportivo Mandiyú footballers
Cruz Azul footballers
Tecos F.C. footballers
Club Universidad Nacional footballers
C.F. Monterrey players
Chiapas F.C. footballers
Club León footballers
Querétaro F.C. footballers
Deportes Tolima footballers
Lagartos de Tabasco footballers
Liga MX players
Paraguay international footballers
1991 Copa América players
1998 FIFA World Cup players
Footballers at the 1992 Summer Olympics
Olympic footballers of Paraguay
Paraguayan expatriate footballers
Expatriate footballers in Mexico
Expatriate footballers in Argentina
Paraguayan expatriate sportspeople in Colombia
Expatriate footballers in Colombia
Sportspeople from Luque
Association football forwards